Gleb Vassielievich Wataghin (November 3, 1899 in Birzula, Russian Empire – October 10, 1986 in Turin, Italy) was a Russian-Italian theoretical and experimental physicist and a great scientific leader who gave a great impulse to the teaching and research on physics in two continents: in the University of São Paulo, São Paulo, Brazil; and in the University of Turin, Turin, Italy.

Wataghin was hired in 1934 to found with other European physicists the Department of Physics of the recently founded University of São Paulo. There, he was the tutor of a group of young physicists, such as César Lattes, Oscar Sala, Mário Schenberg, Roberto Salmeron, Marcelo Damy de Souza Santos and Jayme Tiomno. The Institute of Physics of the State University of Campinas, in Campinas, Brazil, was named in his honour, as well as a prize in Physics. In 1955, he received an honorary doctorate from the University of São Paulo.

He was awarded the Feltrinelli Prize in 1951 and was national member of the Accademia Nazionale dei Lincei, from 1960.

Selected bibliography

Notes

External links

 Predazzi, Ernesto: Gleb Wataghin. Brazilian Physical Society (in Portuguese)
 Salmeron, Roberto A. Gleb Wataghin. Revista Estudos Avançados. Vol. 16, Jan./Apr. 2002. (In Portuguese)

1899 births
1986 deaths
20th-century Italian physicists
Expatriate academics in Brazil
People associated with the State University of Campinas
People from Odesa Oblast
Russian emigrants to Italy
Academic staff of the University of São Paulo
University of Turin alumni
Academic staff of the University of Turin
Fellows of the American Physical Society
20th-century Brazilian physicists